This is a list of 116 species in Leptopharsa, a genus of lace bugs in the family Tingidae.

Leptopharsa species

 Leptopharsa albella Drake, 1935 i c g
 Leptopharsa angustata (Champion, 1897) i c g
 Leptopharsa aporia Drake and Ruhoff, 1965 i c g
 Leptopharsa arta Drake and Poor, 1942 i c g
 Leptopharsa artocarpi Drake and Hambleton, 1938 i c g
 Leptopharsa atibaiae Drake and Ruhoff, 1962 i c g
 Leptopharsa avia Drake, 1953 i c g
 Leptopharsa bifasciata (Champion, 1897) i c
 Leptopharsa bondari Drake and Poor, 1939 i c g
 Leptopharsa bradleyi (Drake, 1931) i c g
 Leptopharsa bredini Froeschner, 1968 i c g
 Leptopharsa callangae Drake and Poor, 1940 i c g
 Leptopharsa calopa Drake, 1928 i c g
 Leptopharsa clitoriae (Heidemann, 1911) i c g
 Leptopharsa cognata Drake and Hambleton, 1934 i c g
 Leptopharsa constricta (Champion, 1897) i c g
 Leptopharsa dampfi (Drake, 1927) i c g
 Leptopharsa dapsilis Drake and Hambleton, 1945 i c g
 Leptopharsa deca Drake and Hambleton, 1945 i c g
 Leptopharsa decens Drake and Hambleton, 1938 i c g
 Leptopharsa deides Drake & Ruhoff, 1965 c g
 Leptopharsa delicata Monte, 1945 i c g
 Leptopharsa difficilis Drake and Hambleton, 1938 i c g
 Leptopharsa dilaticollis (Champion, 1897) i c g
 Leptopharsa distans Drake, 1928 c g
 Leptopharsa distantis Drake, 1928 i g
 Leptopharsa distinconis Drake, 1928 i c g
 Leptopharsa divisa (Champion, 1897) i c g
 Leptopharsa elata (Champion, 1897) i c g
 Leptopharsa elegans (Hacker, 1927) i c g
 Leptopharsa elegantula Stål, 1873 i c g
 Leptopharsa enodata Drake, 1942 i c g
 Leptopharsa euprines Drake and Ruhoff, 1965 i c g
 Leptopharsa evsyunini Golub and Popov, 2000 i g
 Leptopharsa farameae Drake and Hambleton, 1938 i c g
 Leptopharsa fici Drake and Hambleton, 1938 i c g
 Leptopharsa fimbriata (Champion, 1897) i c g
 Leptopharsa firma Drake and Hambleton, 1938 i c g
 Leptopharsa flava Monte, 1940 i c g
 Leptopharsa forsteroniae Drake and Hambleton, 1938 i c g
 Leptopharsa fortis Drake and Hambleton, 1934 i c g
 Leptopharsa frater Golub and Popov, 2003 i g
 Leptopharsa furcata (Stål, 1873) i c g
 Leptopharsa furculata (Champion, 1897) i c g
 Leptopharsa fuscofasciata (Champion, 1897) i c g
 Leptopharsa gibbicarina Froeschner, 1977 i c g
 Leptopharsa gracilenta (Champion, 1897) i c g
 Leptopharsa guatemalensis Drake and Poor, 1939 i c g
 Leptopharsa heidemanni (Osborn & Drake, 1916) i c g b
 Leptopharsa heveae Drake and Poor, 1935 i c g
 Leptopharsa hintoni Drake, 1938 i c g
 Leptopharsa hoffmani Drake, 1928 i c g
 Leptopharsa hyaloptera (Stål, 1873) i c g
 Leptopharsa ignota Drake and Hambleton, 1934 i c g
 Leptopharsa inannana Drake, 1953 i c g
 Leptopharsa inaudita Drake and Hambleton, 1938 i c g
 Leptopharsa jubaris Drake and Hambleton, 1945 i c g
 Leptopharsa laureata Drake and Hambleton, 1945 i c g
 Leptopharsa lauta Drake and Hambleton, 1945 i c g
 Leptopharsa lenatis Drake, 1930 i c g
 Leptopharsa lineata (Champion, 1897) i c g
 Leptopharsa livida Monte, 1943 i c g
 Leptopharsa longipennis (Champion, 1897) i c g
 Leptopharsa luxa Drake and Hambleton, 1945 i c g
 Leptopharsa machaerii Drake and Hambleton, 1934 i c g
 Leptopharsa machalana Drake and Hambleton, 1946 i c g
 Leptopharsa madrigali Froeschner, 1989 i c g
 Leptopharsa marginella (Stål, 1858) i c g
 Leptopharsa miconiae Drake and Hambleton, 1938 i c g
 Leptopharsa milleri Drake, 1954 c g
 Leptopharsa mira Drake and Hambleton, 1934 i c g
 Leptopharsa modica Drake and Hambleton, 1939 i c g
 Leptopharsa nota Drake and Hambleton, 1938 i c g
 Leptopharsa oblonga (Say, 1825) i c g b
 Leptopharsa ocoteae Drake and Hambleton, 1938 i c g
 Leptopharsa ogloblini Drake, 1936 i c g
 Leptopharsa ornata Monte, 1940 i c g
 Leptopharsa ovantis Drake and Hambleton, 1945 i c g
 Leptopharsa pacis Drake and Hambleton, 1939 i c g
 Leptopharsa pallens Monte, 1943 i c g
 Leptopharsa papella Drake, 1941 i c g
 Leptopharsa partita (Champion, 1898) i c g
 Leptopharsa paulana Drake, 1953 i c g
 Leptopharsa pensa Drake and Hambleton, 1939 i c g
 Leptopharsa perbona Drake, 1930 i c g
 Leptopharsa peruensis Drake, 1928 i c g
 Leptopharsa poinari Golub and Popov, 2000 i g
 Leptopharsa posoqueriae Drake and Hambleton, 1938 i c g
 Leptopharsa principis Drake and Hambleton, 1938 i c g
 Leptopharsa probala Drake and Hambleton, 1938 i c g
 Leptopharsa psychotriae Drake and Hambleton, 1939 i c g
 Leptopharsa pudens Drake and Hambleton, 1938 i c g
 Leptopharsa ralla Drake, 1963 i c g
 Leptopharsa reflexa Froeschner, 1989 i c g
 Leptopharsa retrusa Drake and Hambleton, 1939 i c g
 Leptopharsa reuniona Drake, 1957 c g
 Leptopharsa rudgeae Drake and Hambleton, 1934 i c g
 Leptopharsa rumiana Drake and Hambleton, 1946 i c g
 Leptopharsa ruris Drake, 1942 i c g
 Leptopharsa satipona Drake and Hambleton, 1944 i c g
 Leptopharsa sera Drake and Poor, 1939 i c g
 Leptopharsa setigera (Champion, 1897) i c g
 Leptopharsa siderea Drake and Hambleton, 1946 i c g
 Leptopharsa simulans (Stål, 1858) i c g
 Leptopharsa sobrina Monte, 1940 i c g
 Leptopharsa tacanae Coty, Garrouste and Nel, 2014 i g
 Leptopharsa tenuatis Drake, 1928 i c g
 Leptopharsa tenuis (Champion, 1897) i c g
 Leptopharsa unicarinata Champion, 1897 i c g
 Leptopharsa usingeri Drake, 1938 i c g
 Leptopharsa valida Drake and Hambleton, 1938 i c g
 Leptopharsa variegata Monte, 1943 i c g
 Leptopharsa velifer (McAtee, 1917) i c g
 Leptopharsa vicina Drake and Poor, 1939 i c g
 Leptopharsa vittipennis (Stål, 1873) i c g
 Leptopharsa zeteki Drake, 1939 i c g

Data sources: i = ITIS, c = Catalogue of Life, g = GBIF, b = Bugguide.net

References

Leptopharsa
Articles created by Qbugbot